Elizabeth Knowlton (October 23, 1895 – January 29, 1989) was an American mountaineer and writer, who was one of the first female mountain climbers to climb above 20,000 feet in the Himalayas. Knowlton became internationally known as the only female climber in a German-American expedition that attempted to climb the seventh-highest peak in the world, Nanga Parbat in Kashmir.

A collection of historical material of Knowlton's consisting of correspondence, verse and prose manuscripts, published material, diaries, notes, clippings, ephemera and photographs are held at the University of New Hampshire Library Special Collections and Archives.

She graduated from Vassar College and Radcliffe College.

References

1895 births
1989 deaths
American mountain climbers
Vassar College alumni
Radcliffe College alumni
American women writers